The discography of South Korean singer Jung Joon-young consists of a studio album, three extended plays, and twenty singles.

Studio albums

Extended plays

Single albums

Singles

Soundtrack appearances

Collaborations

Other appearances

See also
 Drug Restaurant discography

Notes

References 

Discographies of South Korean artists
K-pop discographies